Frederick William, Duke of Brunswick-Wolfenbüttel (9 October  1771 – 16 June 1815), was a German prince and Duke of Brunswick-Lüneburg and Oels.  Nicknamed "The Black Duke", he was a military officer who led the Black Brunswickers against French domination in Germany. He briefly ruled the state of Brunswick-Wolfenbüttel from 1806 to 1807 and again from 1813 to 1815.

Life
Prince Frederick William of Brunswick-Wolfenbüttel was born in Braunschweig as the fourth son of Charles William Ferdinand, Duke of Brunswick-Lüneburg (on the latter's 36th birthday), and Princess Augusta of Great Britain. He was the first cousin and brother-in-law (from 8 April 1795) of his friend George IV, Prince Regent of the United Kingdom (from 1811).

He joined the Prussian army in 1789 as a captain and participated in battles against Revolutionary France. In 1805, after his uncle, Frederick Augustus, Duke of Oels, had died childless, Frederick William inherited the Duchy of Oels, a small mediatized principality in Silesia subordinate to the King of Prussia.

In October 1806, Frederick William participated in the Battle of Jena-Auerstädt as a major general of the Prussian army, of which his father was the field marshal. His father died from a wound he received in this battle, and Frederick William inherited Brunswick-Wolfenbüttel, since his eldest brother had died childless two months earlier, and both the second and third brother were mentally retarded. After the defeat of Prussia in the Fourth Coalition, his state remained under the control of France, however, and was formally made a part of the short-lived Napoleonic Kingdom of Westphalia in 1807. Frederick William fled to his parents-in-law in Bruchsal in the Grand Duchy of Baden, which had remained a sovereign state with the dissolution of the Holy Roman Empire in 1806 by Francis II, where he lived for the next few years.

When the War of the Fifth Coalition broke out in 1809, Frederick William used this opportunity to create a corps of partisans with the support of the Austrian Empire. This corps was called the Black Brunswickers because they wore black uniforms in mourning for their occupied country. He financed the corps independently by mortgaging his principality in Oels, and made his way from Austrian Bohemia through the French-allied states of Saxony and Westphalia to the North Sea coast.

Frederick William briefly managed to retake control of the city of Braunschweig in August 1809, which gained him the status of a local folk hero. He then fled to Britain to join forces with his brother-in-law, later to be King George IV. His troops were taken into British pay and the Duke was granted the rank of lieutenant general in the British Army on 1 July 1809. His corps of originally 2,300 soldiers was largely destroyed in battles in Spain and Portugal during the Peninsular War.

Frederick William returned to Braunschweig in December 1813, after Prussia had ended French domination in Braunschweig-Lüneburg. When Napoleon returned to the political scene in 1815 during the Hundred Days, Frederick William raised fresh troops. He was killed by a gunshot at the Battle of Quatre Bras on 16 June, the night after he had attended the Duchess of Richmond's ball in Brussels and left it happy to have a chance to show his fighting ability.

Family

On 1 November 1802, in Karlsruhe, Frederick William married Princess Marie Elisabeth of Baden (7 September 1782 Karlsruhe – 20 April 1808 Bruchsal), daughter of Charles Louis, Hereditary Prince of Baden. The couple had three children before Marie died of puerperal fever four days after giving birth to a stillborn daughter.

 Charles (30 October 1804 – 18 August 1873)
 William  (25 April 1806 – 18 October 1884)
 Stillborn daughter (b. & d. 16 April 1808 Bruchsal)

Monuments

 Tomb in the crypt of Brunswick Cathedral
 Brunswick Monument at Quatre Bras, (Genappe, Belgium) erected by the Brunswick State for the 75th anniversary. The bronze lion was cast in the Wilhelm foundry in Bornum
 An 1874 pair of equestrian statues of the Black Duke and his father are outside the Schloss-Arkaden (Brunswick Palace), Braunschweig. They were restored in 1973.

Ancestors

References

Further reading
 Allgemeine Deutsche Biographie, vol. 7, p. 508-514
 Hugo von Franckenberg-Ludwigsdorff: Erinnerungen an das Schwarze Corps, welches Herzog Friedrich Wilhelm von Braunschweig-Oels im Jahre 1809 errichtete. Aus dem Tagebuche eines Veteranen. Schwetschke, Braunschweig 1859, digitized.
 Ruthard von Frankenberg: Im Schwarzen Korps bis Waterloo. Memoiren des Majors Erdmann von Frankenberg. edition von frankenberg, Hamburg 2015, 
 
 Louis Ferdinand Spehr: Friedrich Wilhelm, Herzog von Braunschweig-Lüneburg-Oels. Meyer, 1848, digitized.

External links

 At the House of Welf site

1771 births
1815 deaths
Frederick William
Frederick William
German Lutherans
Freikorps personnel of the Napoleonic Wars
Prussian commanders of the Napoleonic Wars
Frederick William
Protestant monarchs
Major generals of Prussia
German military personnel of the French Revolutionary Wars
German military personnel killed in action
Military personnel killed in the Napoleonic Wars
Dukes of Brunswick
Military personnel from Braunschweig
Burials at Brunswick Cathedral